Pseudoalteromonas rubra is a marine bacterium.

References

External links
Type strain of Pseudoalteromonas rubra at BacDive -  the Bacterial Diversity Metadatabase

Alteromonadales
Bacteria described in 1976